This is a list of notable people from Jhang.

Cricketers 
 Aleem Dar, cricketer and world class cricket umpire who was declared as best umpire of cricket of the year for three consecutive years
 Mariam Hasan, cricketer
 Ghulam Shabber, cricketer

Politicians and bureaucrats 
 Khan Muhammad Arif Khan Rajbana Sial, politician and key figure in Pakistan Movement.
Abida Hussain, politician and ambassador 
 Sahibzada Muhammad Mehboob Sultan, member of National Assembly
Javid Husain, former ambassador/diplomat
 Faisal Saleh Hayat, politician
 Ghulam Bibi Bharwana, politician
 Saima Akhtar Bharwana, politician
 Sheikh Waqas Akram, politician

Scholars and Sufi 
 Shah Jeewna, Muslim Sufi and saint
 Sultan Bahu, Muslim Sufi and saint
 Tahir-ul-Qadri, Muslim Sufi Scholar, Minhaj-ul-Quran

Scientists, doctors & Bankers 
 Abdus Salam, theoretical physicist, Nobel laureate, 1979
 Muhammad Saeed, dental surgeon
 Irshad Hussain chemist and nanomaterials scientist

Writers and poets 
 Majeed Amjad, Urdu language poet
 Mohsin Mighiana, writer and columnist

lists
Jhang-related lists
Jhang